Brian Morton (born 1954) is a Scottish writer, journalist and former broadcaster, specialising in jazz and modern literature.

Early life and education
Born in Paisley, near Glasgow and raised in Dunoon, Morton was educated at the University of Edinburgh and taught in the late 1970s at the University of East Anglia (under Malcolm Bradbury) and the University of Tromsø in Norway.

Writing and broadcasting
From 1992 to 1997, Morton was the main presenter of Impressions for Radio 3, a fortnightly jazz and improvised music programme. For more than a decade Morton was a familiar voice on music programmes and features on other arts related subjects on the London-based BBC networks. For some years he was one of the presenters and a producer of The Usual Suspects, Later he hosted The Brian Morton Show on BBC Radio Scotland, until 2003 after criticising the BBC's arts coverage.

He is co-author, with Richard Cook, of The Penguin Guide to Jazz Recordings (formerly ...on CD), whose ninth edition (undertaken single-handed following Cook's premature death in 2007) was published at the end of October 2008. He is also the author of The Blackwell Guide to Recorded Contemporary Music (1996), which covers modern classical music. Morton was a frequent contributor to Jazz Review magazine, and was briefly editor in 2008; the magazine was absorbed by Jazz Journal in 2009, for which Morton has written. A biography, Miles Davis, was issued by Haus Publishing in 2005. He is a long-standing contributor to The Wire and to the Catholic weekly The Tablet. Morton converted to Catholicism in 1984.

Morton's non-jazz books include translations from the Norwegian of Jonas Lie, Prince: Thief in the Temple (Canongate Books) and Shostakovich (Haus). A short biography of the writer Edgar Allan Poe appeared in November 2009. 

Morton has been a 'Comment' columnist in the Scottish edition of The Observer newspaper and, like his American namesake, is an occasional contributor to The Nation magazine.

Private life and honours
In 2011, Morton relocated to Kintyre, moving with his family into a small former monastery. He now writes and farms with his wife, landscape photographer Sarah MacDonald. They have one son. Morton also has two older daughters from his first marriage. He is writing a biographical study of St Columba.

He holds an honorary D.Litt. from the University of St Andrews, awarded on St Andrews Day, 2000, for services to Scottish broadcasting and cultural life.

References

1954 births
Living people
Academics of the University of East Anglia
Alumni of the University of Edinburgh
BBC Radio 3 presenters
British literary editors
Jazz writers
Scottish journalists 
Academic staff of the University of Tromsø
The Wire (magazine) writers